Fontanella is a comune (municipality) in the Province of Bergamo in the Italian region of Lombardy, located about  east of Milan and about  southeast of Bergamo.

Fontanella borders the following municipalities: Antegnate, Barbata, Calcio, Casaletto di Sopra, Pumenengo, Soncino, Torre Pallavicina.

Population

References